Jorge Zavala Baquerizo (13 May 1921 – 9 May 2014) was an Ecuadorian politician. He served as the Vice President of Ecuador from 1968 to 1970 under the José María Velasco Ibarra administration. He served as President of the National Congress 1987–1988. He was a member of the Democratic Left.

Zavala died in Guayaquil, Ecuador from natural causes, aged 92.

References

1921 births
2014 deaths
People from Guayaquil
Vice presidents of Ecuador
Presidents of the National Congress (Ecuador)
Democratic Left (Ecuador) politicians